General Khin Nyunt (born 23 October 1939) is a Burmese military officer and politician. He held the office of Chief of Intelligence and was Prime Minister of Myanmar from 25 August 2003 until 18 October 2004.

Early life and education

Khin Nyunt was born on 23 October 1939 in Kyauktan Township, near Rangoon (now Yangon). He is of Burmese Chinese descent; his parents are Hakkas with ancestry from Meixian, Meizhou, Guangdong, China. 

Khin Nyunt graduated from the 25th batch of the Officers Training School, Bahtoo in 1960, after dropping out of Yankin College in the late 1950s.

Political career

After his career in the military, he was ordered back to Rangoon in 1984 after an attack on a visiting South Korean delegation. Twenty-one people, including three South Korean cabinet ministers, died during the attack, which occurred on 9 October 1983 and was perpetrated by terrorists sent from North Korea. Khin Nyunt was then appointed Chief of Intelligence. From the mid-1980s to the late 1990s Khin Nyunt was considered to be a protégé of Ne Win, who supposedly retired from politics in July 1988 but who is thought to have continued to be an influential figure behind the scenes until about the late 1990s.

The 1988 uprising that occurred from March to September 1988 was quelled by the military when the State Law and Order Restoration Council (SLORC) was formed on 18 September 1988. The SLORC was renamed as the State Peace and Development Council (SPDC) in 1997, and Khin Nyunt was appointed as its first secretary (Secretary −1), a post which he held until his appointment as Prime Minister in August 2003.

Shortly after Khin Nyunt was appointed as Prime Minister, he announced a seven-point roadmap to democracy; this roadmap was heavily criticized by the Burmese opposition as well as by many foreign governments especially Western ones as it envisaged a permanent military participation in the government. The so-called 'systematic and step-by-step implementation of the road-map to democracy' also contained no time-line.

The first 'step' of the road map was the recalling of the suspended National Convention (NC) which first met in January 1993. The NC was supposed to 'lay down' the basic principles for a new Constitution. The NC met sporadically until the approval of a new constitution in 2008 by what many observers considered the rigged 2008 constitutional referendum.

Prime Minister
After his appointment as Prime Minister, Khin Nyunt's role in the government gave rise to some hope and speculation that there might be some 'liberalization', as he was considered a moderate pragmatist who saw the need of a dialogue with the democratic opposition. The SPDC Chairman Than Shwe and his deputy, General Maung Aye, were seen as hardliners who opposed any relaxation of the military's iron grip of the country.

Controversy
From 1988 until his purge in 2004, he oversaw the arrest of around 10,000 people. Many were subjected to torture and farcical trials that resulted in decades-long prison sentences. Dozens of his military intelligence units harassed, intimidated and detained opposition activists. His military intelligence units infiltrated almost every organization in the country and maintained networks of spies in almost every neighbourhood. Their agents were placed in customs, immigration and police departments, and officers military intelligence even monitored other senior military officials, including top generals.

He was instrumental in closing the universities, then reopening them after they had been relocated to remote, ill-equipped campuses where students could no longer organise protests or get a meaningful education.

Arrest and release
On 18 October 2004, in a one-sentence announcement signed by SPDC Chairman Than Shwe, Khin Nyunt was "permitted to retire on health grounds". However, he was immediately arrested and placed under protective custody.

Allegations of Khin Nyunt's corruption were officially made several days later. Khin Nyunt's dismissal and arrest were the result of a power struggle in which the junta's strongman, Than Shwe, successfully managed to clip the power of the "intelligence faction" of the Burmese Armed Forces which Khin Nyunt led. Most of the Generals and military officers in the SPDC, like Than Shwe, did not want to negotiate with Aung San Suu Kyi and the National League for Democracy (NLD).

On 5 July 2005, Khin Nyunt was tried by a Special Tribunal inside Insein prison near Rangoon on various corruption charges. On 21 July 2005, he was sentenced to 44 years in prison, though it is believed that he is ostensibly serving his sentence under house arrest instead of in prison. Khin Nyunt's sons were also sentenced to 51 and 68 years respectively. It is unclear whether his wife was also indicted.

In July 2009, a video of Khin Nyunt at the home of former Burmese minister Brigadier-General Tint Swe, taken on 7 July 2009, was leaked to the public and there have been reports that Khin Nyunt and his wife have been able to travel outside their home on occasion, since March 2008. In December 2010, another 16-minute video of Khin Nyunt meeting with the Chief of Police Khin Yi and other senior police officers was circulated on YouTube.

His brother-in-law was Than Nyein, a long-term political prisoner under military regime and founder of National Democratic Force Party, who died of lung cancer in Yangon on 21 May 2014. Tin Htut, his son in law, has been in prison since October 2004. Khin Nyunt was released from house arrest on 13 January 2012 by the order of President Thein Sein.

Later life
After his release from house arrest, Khin Nyunt moved to a villa in Mayangone Township. He opened a coffee shop, art gallery and a souvenir shop which sells items to tourists, such as wood carvings. On 2 March 2015, he released his 657-page autobiography. On 5 December 2021, Min Aung Hlaing, the current Commander-in-Chief of the Tadmadaw paid a visit to his home. The former general is reported to be suffering from Alzheimer's disease and have requested for pension and other compensations.

Personal life
He is married to Khin Win Shwe, a medical doctor, and has a daughter, Thin Le Le Win, two sons, Lieutenant Colonel Zaw Naing Oo and Dr. Ye Naing Wynn, a doctor and entrepreneur who owns Aroma Gourmet Concepts Ltd, a pioneer of coffee culture in Myanmar since 1998 and Bagan Cybertech, one of the earliest internet service providers in Myanmar, as well as various café, apparel and sportswear chains. He reportedly has seven grandchildren, some of which are doctors and a few are said to be studying overseas.

References

External links
We Restored Order – Asiaweek interview with Khin Nyunt from 1999

1939 births
Living people
Burmese people of Chinese descent
Burmese prisoners and detainees
Hakka generals
Spymasters
Burmese politicians of Chinese descent
People from Yangon Region
Prime Ministers of Myanmar
Prisoners and detainees of Myanmar
University of Yangon alumni
Burmese generals
Heads of government who were later imprisoned
Officers Training School, Bahtoo alumni